Hindenburg: The Untold Story known in Germany as Das Geheimnis der Hindenburg ("The Secret of the Hindenburg") and Die Hindenburg: die ungeklärte Katastrophe, is a two-hour docudrama about the disaster of the Hindenburg, and the investigation that followed. It aired on May 6, 2007, to commemorate the 70th anniversary of the disaster. It was commissioned by Channel 4, ZDF, and the Smithsonian Networks to be produced by Pioneer Productions and has also aired on Discovery Channel Canada. Its original working title was Hindenburg and is also known as Hindenburg: Titanic of the skies (which should not be confused with Titanic of the Sky, a different documentary by Vidicom). The British version is narrated by Malcolm Tierney who plays the role of Hugo Eckener, while John Shrapnel narrates an alternative version which features interviews with survivors.

It provides a reenactment of the Hindenburg disaster using a detailed computer animated model. The animation was done by Red Vision, which also did the animation for two previous documentaries on the Hindenburg disaster: Hindenburg Disaster: Probable Cause and an episode of Seconds From Disaster. The film mainly focuses on the official investigation of the disaster. The live actions scenes were shot in Poland and later edited by Red Vision.

Story

The film primarily focuses on the Hindenburgs demise and the official inquiry that followed.

Cast
Narrator*: John Shrapnel (UK dub), Bill Roberts (US version)
Dr. Hugo Eckener: Malcolm Tierney
Commander Rosendahl: Mark McGann
Jean Rosendahl: Lorelei King
Max Pruss: Albert Welling 
Herbert Morrison: Gerard Monaco
Joseph Späh: Simon Lowe
Nelson Morris: Michael Praed
Chief Steward Heinrich Kubis: Thorston Manderlay
Werner Franz: Kamil Krawczykowski
Helmut Lau: Piotr Grabowski
Rudolph Sauter: John Edmondson
Colonel South Trimble (Jr.): Phil Goss

Filmmakers
Director Sean Grundy
Producer Vicky Matthews
Editor Martin Swann
Composer Andrew Hewitt
Cinematographer David Langan

Historical errors

Often there are fake newsreels showing the disaster, though the footage is real. These are obviously simulated recreations, as the narrator for all newsreels are shown as the same for all three newsreel companies, even though it does use the opening part of an actual newsreel of the disaster (Universal Newsreel, Movietone News Special). Also the footage does not match the authentic newsreel, as the "Universal" one uses footage originally from the Pathé coverage of the disaster.
The Hindenburg appears to have crashed on solid concrete and grass. In reality the landing field was wet and sandy.
The newsreel cameramen do not stand on van roofs to film the disaster. Two cameramen had their cameras positioned on van roofs.
Heinrich Kubis, the chief steward, is portrayed as suspicious of passenger Joseph Spah but also sympathetic of him saying "he was okay" and that he was only "feeding his dog." In reality, Kubis believed that Spah was saboteur of the airship.
The flag draped behind the commission and the flags waved by spectators have 50 stars, but the American flag at the time of the disaster would have only had 48.
There is no evidence that Eckener was offered helium in 1929, as the documentary implies. The Hindenburg was designed to use hydrogen cells enclosed within a helium envelope, but the US Helium Control Act prohibited export of helium to other countries.

References

External links
Pioneer Productions Commissioned To Document Hindenburg Tragedy

German documentary films
German aviation films
LZ 129 Hindenburg
Documentary films about aviation accidents or incidents
2007 documentary films
2007 television films
2007 films
Films scored by Andrew Hewitt
2000s German films